Jamie's 15-Minute Meals is a UK food lifestyle programme which aired on Channel 4 in 2012. In each half-hour episode, host Jamie Oliver creates two meals, with each meal taking 15 minutes to prepare.

The show premiered on 22 October 2012 and concluded with its series finale episode on 14 December 2012. A tie-in book of recipes was released on 27 September 2012.

Episodes

Season 1 (2012)

Notes
Early episodes of the show used "Buffalo Stance" by Neneh Cherry as the theme tune and background music.

References

External links 
 15-Minute Meals at Channel 4 
 Scrapbook of recipes
 Fresh One Productions

British cooking television shows
Channel 4 original programming
2012 British television series debuts
2012 British television series endings
CBS original programming